Hummingbird Highway is one of the four major highways in Belize. It connects the George Price Highway outside of Belmopan, Cayo District to the Southern Highway outside of Dangriga, Stann Creek District. It partially follows, and sometimes uses the infrastructure of, the former Stann Creek Railway (see Rail transport in Belize).

A paving project was completed in 1994. All the citrus produced in Belize travels along this highway to the two major processing plants in Stann Creek district. There are quite a few small villages along the highway. A new bridge was completed over the Sibun River in 2004, and a new bridge inaugurated in 2006 across Silver Creek; however, there are still quite a few one-lane dilapidated bridges over numerous creeks and streams.

The traffic along the Hummingbird Highway has been on the increase lately due to an increase in demand for eco-tourism and the passage of petroleum trucks, which use the Highway as a shortcut en route to the George Price Highway (which terminates at the Guatemala border). The Hummingbird Highway is the only Highway in Belize which cuts through the mountains of Belize. The highway rests in a valley which comprises citrus orchards in the lowland and untouched jungle habitat on the outskirts and beyond.

Junction list

Roads in Belize
Cayo District
Stann Creek District